Omega-hydroxypalmitate O-feruloyl transferase (hydroxycinnamoyl-CoA omega-hydroxypalmitic acid O-hydroxycinnamoyltransferase, HHT) is an enzyme with systematic name feruloyl-CoA:16-hydroxypalmitate feruloyltransferase. This enzyme catalyses the following chemical reaction

 feruloyl-CoA + 16-hydroxypalmitate  CoA + 16-feruloyloxypalmitate

p-Coumaroyl-CoA and sinapoyl-CoA also act as substrates.

References

External links 
 

EC 2.3.1